Trimethyldiphenylpropylamine (N,N,1-Trimethyl-3,3-diphenylpropylamine) is a drug used for functional gastrointestinal disorders. Its tradename is Recipavrin.

See also 
 Emepronium

References 

Dimethylamino compounds